Hana Shiha (born  25 December 1979) is an Egyptian actress. She graduated from the Academy of Arts in Egypt, majoring acting and directing. She started her career in the hit series "el bar el Gharbi" in 2002 while she was still a student

Biography
Hana Shiha was born on 25 December 1979 in Beirut, Lebanon to an Egyptian-Lebanese artistic family of 4 sisters: "Hala Shiha", "Maya Shiha" and "Rasha Shiha".

Hana's father, Ahmed Shiha, who is an Internationally proclaimed popular Egyptian painter, and Lebanese mother Nadia Zeitoun both loved arts and saw blossoming talents in there young girls, encouraged her 4 daughters to be more creative, taking piano, ballet lessons as children.
Hana fell in love with reading too, taking it up from her mother, she finished reading the French, British and Egyptian literature, at the age of 16.

In her adolescent years, reading edged out the other arts and became a kind of refuge—as her classmates sought out fun in the sun, the fair-skinned Hana retreated to read more books and gain more knowledge.
Pursuing her passion for stories, cinema and performing, by enrolling in the academy of arts, receiving a bachelor's degree from the high institute of Dramatic arts, majoring acting & directing.

Career

She broke into the silver screen at age 20, landing a role in "EL BAR EL GHARBI"  in 2002. 
That appearance led to further film and television offers, including a lead in Egypt hit film by Khaled el hagar Co-starring Laila Eloui, Hanan Turk and Ashraf abdelbaki "HOB EL BANAT"aka "GIRL'S LOVE" (2003), 
A turn in Enam Mohamed Ali's series"MUBARA ZAWGEYA" (2004),
Followed by the leading role in Sameh Abdel Aziz first film "DARS KHOSOUSY " Aka "PRIVATE LESSON"(2005) with star academy winner " Mohamed Attia".
Shiha's next casting coup scored her more than exposure, While starring as the lovely daddy's girl with Yehya e fakharani in the Hit series "YETRABA FE EZZO" (2007), she won over Egypt's heart, line and sinker. 
2009, Shiha hosted a TV comic show ( 100,7)  which added a new value to the actress as a deadly comic talent.
Imprisoned In the sweetheart role, eager for wider range roles, Shiha wanted to change the known Egypt's sweet heart, the girl next door type, decided to make a turning point in her career to land a new role in the series "SHAREA ABDEL AZIZ" (2011), 
which was a hit success followed by the series "TAREF TALET" aka "THIRD PARTY" (2012) directed by Mohamed Bakir.

She tried to spice up her image by seducing Eyad Nassar in Mohamed Yassin's hit series "MOGA HARRA" aka "THE HEAT WAVE" (2013), Playing a very daring role that changed the whole image of the young actress, from an innocent girl to a daring sexy woman which proved that she had an impressive range as an actress, But achieved her real breakthrough with Khaled Marei's series :
"EL SABAA WASSAYA" aka "THE SEVEN COMMANMENDS " (2014), 
which was a great success, she created the new love icon "Em-Em" along with her acting partner Walid Fawaz who played "arnous".
"Em-Em & Arnous" became the new Egyptian love story icons.
In 2014 Hana Shiha starred the movie "BEFORE THE SPRING " directed by Ahmed Atef, playing a political online activist who fights for election rights and freedom of speech before the 2011 Egyptian revolution.
2015 Hana starred alongside 18 actors in the first Egyptian Epic Series "EL ADH: EL KALAM EL MUBAH" aka "THE VOW" playing "Segag" the girl who killed and overthrew her entire family and made a packed with the devil to be the ruler, As a throne-crazed determined to eliminate any obstacle in her path, Shiha proved that she had an impressive range and deadly look. 
Chosen for her creativity and genuinely playing her roles, Mohamed khan the internationally acclaimed film director picked her to star in his new feature film "ABL ZAHMET EL SEIF" aka "BEFORE THE SUMMER CROWD".
"BEFORE THE SUMMER CROWD" is a breakthrough in the story telling style of Khan's films.
Being a leading lady in a Mohamed khan movie is a turning point and a new stepping stone in Hana Shiha's blossoming career.

Filmography

References

External links

 

1985 births
21st-century Egyptian actresses
Living people
Actresses from Beirut
Egyptian television actresses
Egyptian film actresses
Egyptian Muslims
Egyptian people of Lebanese descent